Silverdale, New Zealand may refer to:

Silverdale, Waikato, suburb of Hamilton
Silverdale, Auckland